MariJo Moore is a writer of mixed Cherokee, Dutch and Irish ancestry, who frequently draws upon Native American culture in her poetry. She won the title of Writer of the Year (2002) by the Wordcraft Circle of Native Writers and Storytellers, one of the most prestigious awards in the Native American literary world.

She has edited several collections, including Eating Fire, Tasting Blood: Breaking the Great Silence of the American Indian Holocaust (2005) and Genocide of the Mind: New Writings by Native Americans (2002), "Unraveling the Spreading Cloth of Time: Indigenous Thoughts Concerning the Universe, Dedicated to Vine Deloria, Jr" (2014), and "When Spirits Visit: A Collection of Stories by Indigenous Writers" (2015). She is also the author of "A Book of Spiritual Wisdom for all days", "Bear Quotes", "Tree Quotes", "Crow Quotes", "Spirit Voices of Bones", and "Red Woman With Backward Eyes and Other Stories".

References
 Q6763376. (2019, March 17). Wikidata. Retrieved 11:13, June 25, 2019 from https://www.wikidata.org/w/index.php?title=Q6763376&oldid=886018610.

External links
Personal website

Living people
American people of Cherokee descent
American people of Dutch descent
American people of Irish descent
American women poets
Year of birth missing (living people)
21st-century American women